The Clapp oscillator or Gouriet oscillator is an LC electronic oscillator that uses a particular combination of an inductor and three capacitors to set the oscillator's frequency. LC oscillators use a transistor (or vacuum tube or other gain element) and a positive feedback network. The oscillator has good frequency stability.

History 
The Clapp oscillator design was published by James Kilton Clapp in 1948 while he worked at General Radio. According to Czech engineer Jiří Vackář, oscillators of this kind were independently developed by several inventors, and one developed by Gouriet had been in operation at the BBC since 1938.

Circuit 

The Clapp oscillator uses a single inductor and three capacitors to set its frequency. The Clapp oscillator is often drawn as a Colpitts oscillator that has an additional capacitor placed in series with the inductor.

The oscillation frequency in Hertz (cycles per second) for the circuit in the figure, which uses a field-effect transistor (FET), is

Capacitors ,  and  form a voltage divider that determines the amount of feedback voltage applied to the transistor input.

Although, the Clapp circuit is used as a variable frequency oscillator (VFO) by making  a variable capacitor, Vackář states that the Clapp oscillator "can only be used for operation on fixed frequencies or at the most over narrow bands (max. about 1:1.2)." For VFOs, Vackář recommends other circuits. See Vackář oscillator.

References

Further reading 

 Ulrich L. Rohde, Ajay K. Poddar, Georg Böck "The Design of Modern Microwave Oscillators for Wireless Applications ", John Wiley & Sons, New York, NY, May, 2005, .
 George Vendelin, Anthony M. Pavio, Ulrich L. Rohde " Microwave Circuit Design Using Linear and Nonlinear Techniques ",  John Wiley & Sons, New York, NY, May, 2005, .
 A. Grebennikov, RF and Microwave Transistor Oscillator Design. Wiley 2007. .

External links
 
 EE 322/322L Wireless Communication Electronics —Lecture #24:  Oscillators. Clapp oscillator. VFO startup

Electronic oscillators